José María Raymundo Cox (born 1 September 1993) is a male Guatemalan racewalker. He competed in the 20 kilometres walk event at the 2015 World Championships in Athletics in Beijing, China. In 2019, he competed in the men's 20 kilometres walk at the 2019 World Athletics Championships held in Doha, Qatar. He did not finish his race.

See also
 Guatemala at the 2015 World Championships in Athletics

References

Guatemalan male racewalkers
Living people
Place of birth missing (living people)
1993 births
World Athletics Championships athletes for Guatemala
Athletes (track and field) at the 2016 Summer Olympics
Olympic athletes of Guatemala
Athletes (track and field) at the 2015 Pan American Games
Athletes (track and field) at the 2019 Pan American Games
Pan American Games competitors for Guatemala
20th-century Guatemalan people
21st-century Guatemalan people